James Anthony Patrick Carr (born 15 September 1972) is a British-Irish comedian, presenter, writer, and actor. He is known for his deadpan delivery of controversial one-liners, for which he has been both praised and criticised, and his distinctive laugh. He began his comedy career in 1997, and he has regularly appeared on television as the host of Channel 4 panel shows such as 8 Out of 10 Cats, 8 Out of 10 Cats Does Countdown, and The Big Fat Quiz of the Year.

Early life and education
James Anthony Patrick Carr was born on 15 September 1972, in Hounslow, London, England, the second of three sons born to Irish immigrant parents Nora Mary (née Lawlor; 19 September 1943 – 7 September 2001) and Patrick James "Jim" Carr (born 1945), an accountant who became the treasurer for computer company Unisys. His parents were married in 1970 and separated in 1994, but never divorced. 

Carr spent most of his early life in the village Farnham Common, Buckinghamshire, where he attended Farnham Common School and Burnham Grammar School. He completed sixth form at the Royal Grammar School in nearby High Wycombe.

In 2001, Carr's mother, Nora Mary, died of pancreatitis, aged 57. Following her death, Carr's relationship with his father became "severely strained". In 2004, his father was arrested and accused of harassing Carr and his brother Colin, but was cleared and won an apology from the Metropolitan Police.  In 2021, Carr said he had not spoken to his father since 2000 and had not seen him in person, with the exception of an autograph signing after a gig in 2015. 

Carr's parents remained in contact with their Irish relatives, and the family made frequent trips to Limerick and Kilkee. After earning four A grades at A-Level, Carr read social science and political science at Gonville and Caius College, Cambridge. He graduated with first-class honours in 1994. He went on to work in the marketing department at Shell, but took voluntary redundancy in January 2000 as he felt "miserable" there. He took a course in neuro-linguistic programming, which he has claimed helped him realise how his mind was working to hold him back from following his dreams of becoming a comedian. Within a month, he began performing stand-up. He performed his first paid stand-up gig later that month, having done his debut pub show unpaid only the previous month.

Career

Television

Hosting
Carr has hosted Channel 4 game shows Distraction and Your Face or Mine?. He presented the 100s series of programmes for Channel 4: 100 Worst Pop Records, 100 Worst Britons, 100 Greatest Cartoon Characters, 100 People Who Look Most Like Jimmy Carr (a spoof) and 100 Scary Moments.

From 2004 until 2006, Carr hosted a United States version of Distraction for Comedy Central. He was also nominated for the 2006 Rose d'Or award for Best Game Show Host. Carr presents The Big Fat Quiz of the Year on Channel 4 each December. He has also presented special episodes known as The Big Fat Quiz of Everything.

Since 2005, Carr has presented the comedy panel show 8 Out of 10 Cats. The show aired on Channel 4 until 2016, when it moved to More4. It later went to E4. Since 2012, Carr has also presented 8 Out of 10 Cats Does Countdown, a combination of his panel show 8 Out of 10 Cats and daytime quiz show Countdown.

In April 2010, Carr hosted the first British version of a comedy roast show, Channel 4's A Comedy Roast. On 6 May 2010, he was a co-host of Channel 4's Alternative Election Night, with David Mitchell, Lauren Laverne and Charlie Brooker. He joined the three presenters again for 10 O'Clock Live, a Channel 4 comedy current-affairs show, which started airing in January 2011.

In 2014 and 2015, Carr guest-presented two episodes of Sunday Night at the Palladium on ITV. In 2018, he presented American comedy panel show The Fix on Netflix. From 2018 to 2020, Carr hosted the Comedy Central series Roast Battle.

Since December 16, 2021, Carr has hosted the game show Jimmy Carr's I Literally Just Told You on Channel 4.

Guest appearances
Carr contributed sketches to Channel 4 topical comedy TV programme The 11 O'Clock Show and has frequently appeared on panel shows A League of Their Own and QI, being one of the most-featured guests for both shows. During a guest appearance on the BBC motoring show Top Gear, Carr set a new celebrity test track lap record on the 'Star in a Reasonably Priced Car' segment. He was described as "the worst driver we've ever had" and "the luckiest man alive" by Top Gear test driver the Stig. Carr hosted a highlights edition of the show, and on the Top Gear Live World Tour of 2009–2010 he hosted the section 'Carmageddon'.

In the US, he has appeared on Late Night with Conan O'Brien twice and The Tonight Show with Jay Leno three times.

Carr has appeared as a contestant on celebrity editions of Deal or No Deal (won £750 for Helen & Douglas House), The Chase (won £1,000 for Variety Club), Benchmark (won £1,000 for Elton John AIDS Foundation), Tipping Point (won £7,000 for Blue Cross) Catchphrase, and Who Wants to be a Millionaire, winning £1,000.

Carr was a guest presenter for one edition of Have I Got News for You; in 2007 he joined Ian Hislop's team in the edition of the show chaired by Ann Widdecombe, with whom he "flirted" outrageously. Later in the episode, Widdecombe stated, "I don't think I shall return to this programme."

Radio
Carr is a regular guest and interviewer on Loose Ends (BBC Radio 4) and The Fred MacAulay Show (BBC Radio Scotland). In January 2005, Carr hosted It's Been a Terrible Year, a comedy review of 2004, on BBC Radio 2. Until July 2006, he had a Sunday-morning radio show on Xfm with comedian Iain Morris.

In January 2006, Carr made a joke on Radio 4's Loose Ends, the punchline of which implied that Gypsy women smelled. The BBC issued an apology, but Carr refused to apologise and continued to use the joke. He appeared in two episodes of the radio series of Flight of the Conchords in 2005.

Podcasts 
Carr has made many podcast appearances over the years, going back to at least 2010 with a one-off podcast called Jimmy Carr and Frankie Boyle: Meet the Comedians. Carr's podcast appearances ramped up significantly during the height of the COVID-19 pandemic, with recent appearances during this period including The Betoota Advocate Podcast, You Made It Weird with Pete Holmes, The Comedian's Comedian, The Jordan B. Peterson Podcast, and Dane Baptiste Questions Everything.

Stand-up comedy
Carr performs stand-up tours continuously over most of the course of the year, taking only five weeks off between them. In 2003, he sold out an entire month's performances of his Edinburgh Festival show Charm Offensive by the second day of the festival.

In 2004, he threatened to sue fellow comedian Jim Davidson for using a joke that Carr considered 'his'. The matter was dropped when it became apparent that the joke in question was an old one used for decades by many different comedians. He toured the country with his show A Public Display of Affection, starting on 9 April 2005 at the Gulbenkian Theatre in Canterbury and ending on 14 January 2006 at the Gielgud Theatre in London's West End. He also appeared at the EICC during the Edinburgh Festival in August 2005 with his Off The Telly show. In late November 2005, he released his second DVD, Jimmy Carr: Stand Up.

In August 2006, he commenced the tour Gag Reflex, for which he won the 2006 British Comedy Award for "Best Live Stand-Up". He released his third DVD, Jimmy Carr: Comedian, in November 2007. In 2003, he was listed in the Observer as one of the 50 funniest acts in British comedy. In 2007, a poll on the Channel 4 website for 100 Greatest Stand-Ups, Jimmy Carr was 12th. A new national tour commenced in autumn 2007 named Repeat Offender, beginning at the Edinburgh Festival. In late 2008, Carr began touring his latest show, Joke Technician.

On 3 February 2007, Carr's performance in front of 50 people in London was broadcast simultaneously on the virtual platform Second Life.

His Rapier Wit tour opened on 20 August 2009 with nine shows at the Edinburgh Festival before touring the UK. He released a DVD entitled Jimmy Carr: Telling Jokes on 2 November 2009. Also in July 2009, Carr toured with Las Vegas band the Killers.

In October 2009, Carr received criticism from Sunday tabloid newspapers for a joke he made about British soldiers who had lost limbs in Iraq and Afghanistan, saying the UK would have a strong team in the London 2012 Paralympic Games. Carr defended his own joke as "totally acceptable" in an interview with The Guardian.

Carr's sixth Live DVD, Jimmy Carr: Making People Laugh, was released on 8 November 2010. Carr's 2010–11 tour, entitled Laughter Therapy, started with a run at the Edinburgh Festival before touring the UK.

Carr was criticised in November 2011 for a joke about the Variety Club's Sunshine coaches, which offer holidays for children with Down syndrome. The charity and Down Syndrome Education International condemned the joke. Carr defended himself by saying nothing should be off limits.

A Guardian profile in 2012 said: "In terms of reach and earning power... one of the nation's most popular stand-up comedians... in his ability to pull in crowds which generate millions in tour and DVD sales..." and as "the undisputed king of deadpan one-liners...".

Carr released the Jimmy Carr: Laughing and Joking DVD on 18 November 2013.

In June 2019, Carr was criticised for the content of his touring show Terribly Funny. Among the controversial jokes were jokes about dwarves, fat women and female genital mutilation. Carr was also criticised by charity Little People UK (co-founded by actor Warwick Davis), accusing him of prejudice for an "offensive" abortion joke he made about people with dwarfism.

Books
In 2006 the book The Naked Jape: Uncovering the Hidden World of Jokes, on the history and theory of joke-telling, by Carr and Lucy Greeves, was published by Penguin.

Before & Laughter, a memoir and self-help book, was published by Quercus in December 2021.

Controversies

2012 tax avoidance
In June 2012, Carr's involvement in an alleged K2 tax avoidance scheme came to light after an investigation by The Times. The scheme is understood to involve UK earners "quitting" their job and signing new employment contracts with offshore shell companies based in the low-tax jurisdiction of Jersey. Then-Prime Minister David Cameron said: "People work hard, they pay their taxes, they save up to go to one of his shows. They buy the tickets. He is taking the money from those tickets and he, as far as I can see, is putting all of that into some very dodgy tax-avoiding schemes." Carr subsequently pulled out of the scheme, apologising for "a terrible error of judgement".

Viewing figures of the episode of his topical show 8 out of 10 Cats, recorded on the day of his apology and broadcast the following day, almost doubled compared with the previous week. Earlier in 2012, during the second series of Channel 4's satirical news programme 10 O'Clock Live, Carr had lampooned people who avoid paying their taxes. A sketch from the show, in which he poked fun at the 1% tax rate of Barclays Bank and described tax lawyers as being "aggressive" and "amoral", was regarded as having "come back to haunt him".

In February 2018, Carr appeared on Room 101, where he talked about the controversy. Though he admitted that what he did was wrong, he said there was some level of hypocrisy in the comments that Cameron had made about him in 2012, stating that members of Cameron's family and Queen Elizabeth II had subsequently been mentioned in the Panama Papers and Paradise Papers tax evasion scandals. Carr said that the law should become clearer by eliminating any loopholes, instead of leaving it up to individuals to decide what is morally right. Carr continues to reference the scandal in his performances and public appearances.

2021 Holocaust joke
In a stand-up comedy performance released as a Christmas 2021 Netflix special titled His Dark Material, Carr said that a "positive" of the Holocaust was the genocide of thousands of "Gypsies" by Nazi Germany.  During the show, Carr defended his joke, saying that it had the educational value of raising awareness about groups who suffered genocide in the Holocaust. The show had been released in December 2021 but received widespread attention the following February after an edited clip was posted and shared online. He was condemned by the Auschwitz Memorial, Hope not Hate and The Traveller Movement, who called anti-Romani prejudice the "last acceptable form of racism" in the UK. He also faced criticism from British politicians, including Prime Minister Boris Johnson and Nadine Dorries, the culture secretary. The Holocaust Memorial Day Trust said they were "absolutely appalled" and "horrified", and describing Carr's joke as "abhorrent". Despite the criticism, Carr stood by the joke.

Personal life
In the late 1990s, when he was 26 years old, Carr had what he calls "an early midlife crisis" during which he lost his Catholic faith. He has since made comments critical of organised religion. In 2015, he said: "As for being a Christian, yes, it seems ridiculous now, but I genuinely believed there was a big man in the sky who could grant wishes. Writers like Christopher Hitchens and Richard Dawkins helped change my view, but I don't go on stage banging on about being an atheist... I'm just a guy who tells jokes." He has stated that he underwent a lot of psychotherapy (specifically neuro-linguistic programming) at the time of his crisis in order to help him cope with his loss of faith, and that he is qualified as a therapist.

Carr has spoken of the depression he experienced in his 20s, while working in marketing, and credits his decision to pursue a comedy career in helping him to cope with depression. He has dual British and Irish citizenship, travels on an Irish passport, has spoken of his pride in having Irish ancestry, and was presented in 2013 with a certificate of Irish heritage in his parents' home city of Limerick by the city's mayor.

Carr lives in North London with his Canadian girlfriend Karoline Copping, a commissioning editor for Channel 5, with whom he has been in a relationship since 2001. Their son was born in 2019.

Awards
 Time Out Award: Best Stand Up (2002)
Perrier Award Nomination (2002)
 Royal Television Society Award: Best On-Screen Newcomer (2003)
 LAFTA Award: Best Stand Up (2004)
Rose D'Or Nomination: Best Presenter, Distraction (2004)
 LAFTA Award: Funniest Man (2005)
 British Comedy Award: Best Live Stand Up (2006)
 LAFTA Award: Funniest Man (2007)
 LAFTA Award: Best Stand Up (2008)
LAFTA Award: Loaded Legend (2011)

Works

Tours

Comedy specials

Filmography
Film

Television

Guest appearances

QI (2003–2022)
A League of Their Own (2010–2017)
Deal or No Deal (2012)
Was it Something I Said? (2013)
Through the Keyhole (2014, 2015, 2017)
Top Gear (2004, 2006, 2013)
Celebrity Juice (2014–2019)
Alan Davies: As Yet Untitled (2015, 2017)
Celebrity Squares (2015)
Celebrity Benchmark (2015)
Crackanory (2015)
Virtually Famous (2016, 2017)
The Tonight Show Starring Jimmy Fallon (2016)
@midnight (2016)
Chelsea (2016)
The Chase: Celebrity Special (2012, 2019)
Tipping Point: Lucky Stars (2016)
The Grand Tour (2016)
Play to the Whistle (2017)
Catchphrase: Celebrity Special (2018)
Room 101 (2018)
This Is My House (2021)
Who Wants to Be a Millionaire? Celebrity Special (2021)

Books
 2004, Distraction Quiz Book (foreword)
 2006, with Lucy Greeves, The Naked Jape: Uncovering the Hidden World of Jokes (UK), or Only Joking: What's So Funny About Making People Laugh (USA)
2021, Before & Laughter: A Life-Changing Book

Discography 
 = (Ed Sheeran, 2021) – backing vocals on "Visiting Hours"

References

External links

 
 
 
 BBC Radio 4 – Jimmy Carr, Desert Island Discs, March 2017

1972 births
Living people
20th-century British comedians
20th-century British male actors
21st-century British comedians
21st-century British male actors
Alumni of Gonville and Caius College, Cambridge
Antiziganism in the United Kingdom
British atheists
British game show hosts
British male comedians
British male film actors
British people of Irish descent
British stand-up comedians
British television personalities
Comedians from London
Critics of religions
Former Roman Catholics
Male actors from Berkshire
Male actors from London
People educated at Burnham Grammar School
People educated at the Royal Grammar School, High Wycombe
People from Hounslow
People from Isleworth
People from Slough